Spain is competing at the 2014 European Athletics Championships in Zürich, Switzerland, from 12 to 17 August 2014.

The following athletes has been selected to compete by the Spanish Athletics Federation.

Medals

Results

Men
Track & road events

Field events

Women 
Track & road events

Field events

References

Nations at the 2014 European Athletics Championships
2014
European Athletics Championships